Linda Jo Miller, credited as Linda Miller and also known as Leslie Michaels (born December 26, 1947) is an American actress known for King Kong Escapes (1967), The Green Slime (1968) and the TV series Seven Faces of Man.

Career 
Miller lived in Japan as a teenager and young adult, during which time she starred in Japanese productions, most notably King Kong Escapes. She returned with her family to the United States after 1968. In the U.S., she briefly pursued an acting career under the name Leslie Michaels, as Linda Miller was already taken by a Screen Actors Guild member, appearing in My Three Sons in a guest role.

For many years, her identity was a mystery among King Kong fans. She was "rediscovered" in 2014 and has since appeared in the G-Fan magazine and in conventions.

Personal life 
As of 2014. Miller resided in Powhatan, Virginia.

Filmography

Film

Television

References

External links
 2015 interview
 2019 interview

1947 births
Living people
Actresses from Pennsylvania
20th-century American actresses
21st-century American women